Callistosporium palmarum is a species of fungus in the family Tricholomataceae, and the type species of the genus Callistosporium. Originally named Gymnopus palmarum by William Alphonso Murrill in 1939, the species was transferred to the genus Callistosporium by Rolf Singer in 1944.

References

External links

Tricholomataceae
Fungi of North America
Taxa named by William Alphonso Murrill